Geesops is an extinct genus of trilobites in the family Phacopidae. There are about five described species in Geesops.

Species
These five species belong to the genus Geesops:
 Geesops battidohmi
 Geesops brunopauli
 Geesops icovellaunae Viersen, Taghon & Magrean, 2019
 Geesops sparsinodosus
 Geesops synapticus

References

Phacopidae